Darren Stanley Hayes (born 8 May 1972) is an Australian singer, songwriter, music producer and composer. He was the frontman and singer of the pop duo Savage Garden until their disbandment. Their 1997 album Savage Garden peaked at number 1 in Australia, number 2 in the United Kingdom and number 3 in the United States. It spawned the singles "I Want You", "To the Moon and Back", and Australian and US number 1 "Truly Madly Deeply". The duo followed the success of their debut album with Affirmation (1999), which provided additional hits such as Australian and US number 1 "I Knew I Loved You", and Australian number 3 "The Animal Song". Savage Garden parted ways in 2001.

Hayes released his first solo album Spin in 2002. The album sold two million copies worldwide, debuted at Number 2 in the UK and number 3 in Australia. It delivered the hit single "Insatiable". Hayes's second album, The Tension and the Spark, was released in 2004. He parted ways with his record label Columbia Records in 2006 and started his own independent record label, Powdered Sugar, from which he would release his third and fourth solo albums, 2007's This Delicate Thing We've Made and 2011's Secret Codes and Battleships.

After a decade-long hiatus, Hayes returned in 2022 with singles "Let's Try Being in Love", "Do You Remember?", "Poison Blood", and "All You Pretty Things", all taken from his fifth studio album, Homosexual, which was released in October 2022. Hayes headlined the 2022 Sydney Gay and Lesbian Mardi Gras Parade, and announced an Australian, UK and USA/Canada tour for 2023.

Early life and education
At school, Hayes was bullied and physically and verbally abused. He described himself as "a big-hearted, emotional, and excitable" teenager, with an obsession for Star Wars and E.T. Hayes ' father was an alcoholic, and regularly subjected Hayes and his mother to violence.

In late 1987, he got the chance to see his hero Michael Jackson performing live in Brisbane as part of the Bad Tour. He credits this as encouraging him to pursue a career in entertainment. His other acknowledged influences are Stevie Nicks, Madonna, Peter Gabriel, Kate Bush, Annie Lennox, Prince and Marvin Gaye, and he has cited U2's "With or Without You" as the most touching song he has ever heard.

Music career

1993–2001: Savage Garden

In 1993, Hayes answered an advertisement in a Brisbane music magazine, Time Off, placed by Daniel Jones, for a lead vocalist position in the band called Red Edge. Hayes was successful, despite his voice breaking in the audition, as he mentioned in an interview with Rosie O'Donnell. The cover band broke up in 1994 and Hayes formed a partnership with Jones, a duo band initially called Crush. However, another band in the UK already owned the rights to the name. Hayes and Jones submitted their first demo tape to record companies under the name Bliss, before they eventually changed their name to Savage Garden, a phrase used by Anne Rice to describe the world through the eyes of Lestat de Lioncourt in her novel The Vampire Lestat. The Savage Garden is a vision of Earth in which the natural laws of the world govern over anything aesthetic or civil.

Savage Garden started recording their debut album in 1995 with producer Charles Fisher. Their first single, "I Want You", was released in 1996 and was the best selling single by an Australian artist that year. The second single, "To the Moon and Back", topped the Australian charts at the end of 1996. The third single, "Truly Madly Deeply", was their second number one and was the best-selling Australian single of 1997. Their debut album, Savage Garden, was the best-selling album in Australia during 1997 and the duo won ten ARIA awards.

Hayes moved to New York City to promote Savage Garden internationally, while Daniel Jones stayed in Brisbane. The move proved to be successful, with "Truly Madly Deeply" going to the top of the American charts in 1998. The Savage Garden album sold seven million copies in the US on the back of this success.

In New York City, Hayes wrote Affirmation. He had recently divorced his wife of several years. Parts of the album reflected the pain from the end of the relationship. Affirmation was released in 1999 and proved to be another hit, with lead single "I Knew I Loved You" going to number one in the United States, and the album selling six million copies worldwide by the end of 2000. The pair played the title track of the album at the closing ceremony of the 2000 Sydney Olympics.

Hayes moved to Sausalito in 2000. He became the public face of the duo, doing most of the media. Hayes announced that Savage Garden had broken up in October 2001 during a chat with an Australian journalist. Hayes thought the information would be saved for a later article; it was not. When confronted with this information during the early morning hours, before an unrelated interview, Jones denied the break-up of the band. However, it appears that Jones did not believe the reporter was accurately quoting Hayes and denied what he thought was yet another break-up rumour. Still, the fact that Jones took a back seat in all promotional activities for Affirmation seems indicative that Jones was not content to remain within Savage Garden as it had operated in the past. Savage Garden had sold over 23 million albums by that stage.
Luciano Pavarotti and Darren Hayes sang "O Sole Mio" together in a concert in 2000.

In 2005, manager of Savage Garden, John Woodruff confirmed that Jones had announced his intention of leaving Savage Garden prior to the promotion for Affirmation. Woodruff criticised the media for their treatment of Hayes. The duo have never issued a united statement regarding the situation, yet Hayes has guaranteed that the group will "never, by any chance" reunite, adding in 2020, "Imagine if you had come out and survived a really dysfunctional and toxic relationship, and then for years later people would ask you to please get back in that relationship [...] "I once said I'd only do it if it cured cancer and that's still how I feel."

2002–2004: Spin and The Tension and the Spark
Hayes recorded his first solo album, Spin, which was released in 2002. The album was produced by Walter Afanasieff, the producer of Affirmation. Spin carried on in the same musical vein as Savage Garden, with a less soft rock sound and more edgy R&B vibe, although the first single "Insatiable" was a ballad, reaching Number 3 in Australia. Other singles "Strange Relationship", "Crush (1980 Me)" and "I Miss You" also performed well in charts. The album reached the Top 5 in Australia at Number 3, and in the UK at Number 2. It also reached the top ten in Denmark, Sweden and Finland. In the United States, the album failed to make the same impact as Savage Garden's previous releases, reaching Number 35 on Billboard. It was later re-issued with a bonus disc consisting of some live and studio tracks.

Hayes spent two years working on his second solo album, The Tension and the Spark. Other than the track "I Forgive You", which was produced with Madonna collaborator Marius De Vries, the entire album was produced by Hayes and Robert Conley (with whom he had previously toured and recorded "Crush (1980 Me)" for Spin and "Do You Believe" for Specificus). The album marked a bold change of direction for Hayes. Conley's production was almost entirely electronic, with acoustic instruments buried under walls of sequenced sounds. Although artistically this was a huge step forward and earned Hayes the strongest praise of his career, it alienated a large portion of his audience, who were expecting another album of radio-friendly pop songs. The first single, "Pop!ular", was released on 12 July 2004. This single reached Number One on the US Dance Charts, and fared well in the UK. Hayes's follow-up single, "Darkness", charted in the lower regions of the ARIA top 50 charts.

One of his out-takes from the Spin sessions, "When You Say You Love Me", was recorded by Clay Aiken in 2003 for his Measure of a Man album. It was later covered by Human Nature, resulting in an Australian top 20 single in April 2004 off their Walk The Tightrope album, and was then re-recorded in 2008 featuring Hayes himself.

2005–2006: Truly Madly Completely and parting ways with Columbia
In 2005, Hayes recorded a track he wrote with Robert Conley called "So Beautiful", which was included on the Savage Garden greatest hits compilation, Truly Madly Completely: The Best of Savage Garden. The compilation also includes a second track by Hayes called "California". Both of these tracks hark back to Hayes's early sound, although still retaining some of the electronic flourishes from The Tension and the Spark.

On 9 July 2006, Hayes announced that he had parted ways with Columbia Records after ten years and 24 million album sales together.

The tour following this release saw Hayes play the iconic Sydney Opera House. The performance was recorded and released on a DVD entitled A Big Night in with Darren Hayes.

2007–2008: This Delicate Thing We've Made

Hayes finished recording his third solo album, This Delicate Thing We've Made, in 2007. The album was a double-disc, with 25 tracks. Many of the tracks were co-written with Robert Conley, and a great deal of the album was written with and produced by Justin Shave, who played keyboards for part of Hayes's Time Machine tour. The album was released on 20 August 2007 on Hayes's own independent record label, Powdered Sugar, while the first single, "On the Verge of Something Wonderful", was released in Australia on 28 July 2007 and in the UK and online on 6 August 2007.

On 9 April 2007, Hayes released the album track "Who Would Have Thought" from This Delicate Thing We've Made as a teaser track on his official website, as well as his MySpace profile. This was accompanied by an animation for the song created by his partner, animator and director, Richard Cullen. Around April 2007, remixes of the album track "Step into the Light" were being played in clubs around the world. The album version of "Step into the Light" was released as a teaser on Hayes's official website and MySpace on 30 April 2007.

During the first half of 2007, Hayes performed selected songs from the album in The Time Machine World Tour small, exclusive gigs around the world. Tickets for several of these much sought after shows sold out in under ten minutes. In June 2007, Hayes embarked on a small tour of USA and Canada, stopping in New York, Toronto, Chicago, San Francisco and Los Angeles, along with the band Temposhark. The shows were well received with very positive reviews.

On 30 June 2007, Hayes headlined the London Gay Pride at Trafalgar Square. He performed "I Want You" and "On the Verge of Something Wonderful", as well as a medley that included "Pop!ular".

In July 2007, Hayes announced The Time Machine Tour that would start out in the UK, and then move on to Hayes's home country Australia. On 29 July 2007, "On the Verge of Something Wonderful" was the most selected music video on The Box in the UK. On 20 August 2007, This Delicate Thing We've Made was released in the UK, America and Australia. 'The Time Machine Tour' included venues such as The Royal Albert Hall and the State Theatre in Sydney. His stage was again designed by Willie Williams and included a large bridge that could extend over the first few rows of seats. On the final night, at the Queensland Performing Arts Centre in Hayes's hometown of Brisbane, the performance was recorded in HD for a DVD release. The Time Machine Tour DVD came out in two editions: the special edition which was limited to 2000 copies and contained a four-panel, fold-out, gleaming white box, a thirty-two-page color booklet with 300 photos and notes from the artist, and the regular edition. The special edition DVD, which was only available from Hayes' website, was shipped to purchasers on 1 July, and the regular edition, which was available in shops, was released on 22 July.

Hayes did a mini tour in the US in November and December 2007, making appearances at Borders stores and performing two shows in New York City and Philadelphia.

On 18 December 2007, Hayes announced "The Side Two Tour". The show toured the UK in February 2008 and featured Hayes performing songs from This Delicate Thing We've Made that were not featured on "The Time Machine Tour", in a more intimate setting. In late 2008, the DVD This Delicate Film We've Made was announced. The DVD featured selected songs from the album, arranged in a new sequence, and set to visuals that told a loose, abstract animated narrative. The DVD entered the UK music DVD charts at Number 1.

2009–2010: We Are Smug
On 19 April 2009, Hayes teased via Twitter that he was preparing another album. On 8 May, Hayes announced, via his MySpace page, that he and Robert Conley had produced an album together titled We Are Smug. The ten-track album, with a fair amount of experimentation with both lyrics and music, was made available via a link from his MySpace page, and was made free to download to gauge acceptability of Hayes's shifting musical styles. The album is heavily electronic with some heavy beats. It also contains some explicit content. Both Hayes and Conley share vocal duties on this album.

Hayes signed to Sony ATV Music Publishing for a worldwide deal in August 2009. Emma Banks from CAA UK came on board October 2009 to represent Hayes for his touring plans around the new album.

Although the album was completed before the holidays in 2009, Hayes announced in early 2010 that he had more song ideas and he was going back into the studio, which delayed the album another year. Hayes completely finished his fourth solo album in mid-2010, working with top writer/producers from around the world and having the record mixed by Robert Orton.

Hayes also recorded a song for the Finn tribute album He Will Have His Way, a cover of "Not Even Close". It was released on Halloween 2010.

2011–2021: Secret Codes and Battleships and hiatus
On 17 April 2011, Hayes announced that he had signed a record deal with Mercury Records/Universal Music Australia and signed to EMI Services UK /Europe. He released his fourth studio album in October 2011. The first single titled "Talk Talk Talk" was announced in May and was released on 24 June. The single contains a cover version of Madonna's "Angel" as the B-side.

It was announced on 20 June, via Hayes's Facebook page, that his new album would be titled Secret Codes and Battleships.

Hayes announced on Twitter on 22 July that he was shooting a second music video from the album. On 14 August, he revealed in a radio interview that "Black Out the Sun" will be the second single from Secret Codes and Battleships. Since its release in the UK, BBC Radio 2 has selected the track to feature on their A list the week commencing 1 October 2011. He later confirmed, on Twitter, that this song will be the single for the UK and other international markets, while "Bloodstained Heart" would be the second single in Australia. Hayes played dates on "The Secret" Tour in the UK and Australia beginning on 15 October in Liverpool. Hayes tweeted, on 2 March 2012, that he would be shooting another music video the week after. He later confirmed the music video was being shot for "Stupid Mistake", which was released as the album's fourth single in May 2012.

Since 2013, Hayes stopped his music career and tried to build a stand-up comedy career. At the same time, he kept creating short singing videos in his social media accounts for his fans. In an 2022 interview with Queerty, Hayes said that he had actually planned to retire at that point. In 2018 Hayes briefly returned on stage with one-off performance of two songs, including "I Knew I Loved You". In 2019, Hayes featured on Cub Sport's single "I Never Cried So Much in My Whole Life". He did not appear in the official video. In 2020 he recorded a new version of "Truly Madly Deeply" with slightly modified lyrics. The video of his studio performance was released on YouTube on 24 April.

2022–present: Homosexual and Do You Remember? tour
On 26 January 2022, Hayes released the single, "Let's Try Being in Love". A music video for the song was released the same day, starring Hayes and featuring actor Scott Evans. The video was directed by Andrew Putschoegl. Referred to as a "queer anthem" by NME, in promotional interviews, Hayes explained "I've been married to Richard [Cullen] for almost 17 years, [and] I'm in this really comfortable place in my life. But at the same time at mid-life I'm grieving the fact I never got to celebrate who I really was at the period of my life where I was most famous. I look at this world we live in now where someone like Lil Nas X can push forward his true self, full of pride and self-love and have the chance to be loved for who he truly is [...] A lot of the time I was my most famous, I was deeply sad." Less than 24 hours of release, "Let's Try Being in Love" debuted at number 96 on the Official UK Singles Download Chart Top 100 and at number 98 on the Official UK Singles Sales Chart Top 100. The single also peaked at number 9 on the Australian Independent singles chart. "I wanted to show I love the feminine in me, be proud of the gay me. There's a dance scene that is so passionate, everything's alive and thriving and blooming. That's how I feel in general about music. And that's a hugely sharp contrast to how I felt 10 years ago."

On 27 January 2022, Hayes announced he would be headlining the 2022 Sydney Gay and Lesbian Mardi Gras Parade and would be performing on 5 March 2022. Hayes performed "The Animal Song", "I Want You", "Affirmation" plus, live for the very first time, "Let's Try Being in Love".

On 2 March 2022, Hayes announced the Do You Remember? Tour that would be performed in six Australian cities between January and February 2023 and would feature songs from his musical career as part of Savage Garden and as a solo artist. On 10 March 2022, Hayes released the single "Do You Remember?", following with the official video on 16 March 2022. In June 2022, Hayes released "Poison Blood", which details his life living with depression, and others affected by it. Hayes released the official "Poison Blood" music video on 26 June 2022, announcing UK Tour dates on the same day. A remix of "Let's Try Being in Love" was released on 15 July 2022, with production helmed by Louis La Roche. This was followed on 29 July by Roche's remix to "Do You Remember?".

On 18 August 2022, Hayes announced that Homosexual, his fifth studio album, would be released that October. A fourth single, "All You Pretty Things", was released on 19 August 2022. When the album was released on 7 October 2022, Hayes said "My new album was born from a desire to rid myself of the grief I developed over the years I lost to shame growing up in a world where being gay was met with rejection and condemnation. I wanted to revisit my teenage years with the wisdom of a proud 50-year-old gay man and revisit my youthful memories and view them through this new peach-tinted lens of joy. I imagined an adolescence where I could be loved for who I truly am today. Through this music, my goal was to reclaim my happiness and reclaim my identity. That confidence gave me the courage to explore deep wounds in my life and explore old trauma from the perspective of an effervescent endless summer." Homosexual debuted at number 6 on the Australian Digital Albums and number 16 on the Australian Artist Albums Chart. The album debuted at number 82 on the UK Albums Chart, also placing on the UK Download and Album Sales charts, placing at numbers 3 and 13, respectively.

On 10 February 2023, Peking Duk released a version of "I Want You" featuring re-recorded vocals by Hayes.

Other media
In December 2014, Hayes announced a comedy podcast "The He Said, He Said Show".[16] The podcast debuted on 10 February 2015.[4] Rosie O'Donnell has appeared as a guest.[17] The podcast ended its run at the end of the year. Hayes has co-hosted a comedic movie review podcast with writer and comedian Anthony Armentano called "We Paid To See This". Some of Hayes' sketch comedy can be found on his YouTube page including a Star Wars spoof documentary and several of his sketches he wrote and performed during his time studying at The Groundlings Theatre and School. On 13 March 2016 Hayes announced he had been writing an original musical with writer and comedian Johnny Menke. As of March 2022, the musical has yet to be publicly performed or recorded.

Personal life
Hayes married his childhood sweetheart, makeup artist Colby Taylor, in 1994. They were still married when Savage Garden "skyrocketed to fame around the globe in the late 1990s." They separated in 1998 and were divorced in 2000. Much of the lyrics for the band's second album, Affirmation, dealt with his divorce. He recorded Affirmation in San Francisco mid-1999 and eventually bought a house there. He also maintained a base in London since 2004. In 2013, Hayes moved to Los Angeles.

Hayes started coming out as gay to friends and the head of his label, Sony, in the early 2000s. He entered into a private marriage ceremony with his boyfriend of two years, Richard Cullen, on 23 July 2005 in London. On 19 June 2006, also in London, they entered into a formal civil partnership. Hayes and Cullen applied for a marriage licence in California, and were married on 15 July 2013, to show their support for those fighting for same-sex marriage. Hayes and Cullen live in the United States. Though public speculation about his sexual orientation had been present throughout his career, he kept his personal life private. He announced the event the day prior on his official website. Before the announcement, Cullen's name had appeared on the website as the designer of the cover for Hayes's single "So Beautiful". In a 2017 interview with Attitude, Hayes commented, "I don't regret [publicly coming out] for a second. It wasn't that I was blacklisted, but it was that I became a 'niche' artist purely based on my sexuality. There was a kind of unintentionally patronizing view of me. No longer a sexual object, but more of someone you might take home to Mom [...] I was suddenly your gay uncle. That was frustrating. My sexuality was used as a descriptor, and if you think about it, that's nuts. No one says 'Openly heterosexual singer Adele.' "

Hayes is a Star Wars fan and has been since childhood. He also collects Star Wars memorabilia, and he even auditioned for a role in Star Wars: Episode III – Revenge of the Sith. After JoJo's Bizarre Adventure got the license for his hit song "I Want You" to be used in the animated Part 4 Diamond Is Unbreakable, he expressed his gratitude and also revealed that he is a fan of the series.

Discography

Studio albums
 Spin (2002)
 The Tension and the Spark (2004)
 This Delicate Thing We've Made (2007)
 Secret Codes and Battleships (2011)
 Homosexual (2022)

Awards and nominations

References

External links

 
 

 
1972 births
20th-century Australian male singers
21st-century Australian male singers
APRA Award winners
Australian expatriates in the United States
Australian expatriates in England
Australian pop singers
Australian male singer-songwriters
Australian tenors
Gay singers
Australian gay musicians
Australian LGBT singers
Australian LGBT songwriters
Gay songwriters
Living people
People from Brisbane
Musicians from Brisbane
20th-century LGBT people
21st-century LGBT people
Columbia Records artists
Mercury Records artists